Contessa may refer to:


Entertainment
 Contessa (film), a 2018 Indian film
 Contessa (TV series), a 2018 Philippine television series
 The Contessa, a character in the game show  Where in the World Is Carmen Sandiego?
 The Contessa, a villain from the Sly Cooper video game franchise; see Sly 2: Band of Thieves
 Contessa, a fictional ship the TV series Chuck; see "Chuck Versus the Push Mix"

Transportation
 Contessa 26, a GRP yacht in a range of yachts built by Jeremy Rogers Ltd. and J. J. Taylor & Sons Ltd.
 Contessa 32, a design in a range of GRP yachts built by Jeremy Rogers Ltd.
 Hino Contessa, a 1960s car made by Hino Motors
 Hindustan Contessa, an Indian car made by Hindustan Motors

Other uses
 Polina (singer) or Contessa, American-Russian singer

See also
 Barefoot Contessa (disambiguation)
 Conte (disambiguation) 
 Contes (disambiguation)